Lars Mogstad Ranger (born 12 March 1999) is a Norwegian football defender who plays as a right back for Lillestrøm.

References

1999 births
Living people
People from Gjerdrum
Norwegian footballers
Lillestrøm SK players
Ullensaker/Kisa IL players
Norwegian First Division players
Eliteserien players
Association football defenders
Norway youth international footballers
Norway under-21 international footballers
Sportspeople from Viken (county)